Deer tick may refer to:

 Ixodes scapularis, the eastern North America black-legged tick
 Ixodes pacificus, the western North America black-legged tick
 Ixodes ricinus, the European tick sometimes called a "deer tick" or "sheep tick"
 Deer Tick (band)

See also 
  Lyme disease  (a well-known disease spread by ticks)
 Deer tick virus

Animal common name disambiguation pages